WBQ may refer to:

WBQ, the IATA and FAA LID code for Beaver Airport, an airport in Beaver, Alaska
WBQ, the National Rail code for Warrington Bank Quay railway station, Cheshire, England
WBQ-8, a former callsign of Australian station STQ
Welsh Baccalaureate Qualification, an educational qualification delivered in secondary schools and colleges across Wales